Robert “Bob” Molle (born September 23, 1962) is a Canadian author, speaker and former Olympic wrestler and professional football player.

Football and wrestling
After finishing high school in his hometown of Saskatoon, Saskatchewan, Molle attended Simon Fraser University in Burnaby, British Columbia.

Molle won a silver medal for Canada as a Super Heavyweight wrestler at the 1984 Olympics in Los Angeles. American wrestler Bruce Baumgartner defeated Molle to win the gold medal. He was drafted by the Winnipeg Blue Bombers with the ninth overall pick of the 1985 CFL Draft. On November 27, 1988, he hoisted a Grey Cup as a member of the Blue Bombers' offensive line. He won another Grey Cup in 1990 and eventually became a captain of the Blue Bombers. On September 25, 2016, he was inducted into the Blue Bombers Hall of Fame.

External links
 Athlete Biography at Canadian Olympic Committee
 Just Sports Stats
 

Living people
1962 births
Sportspeople from Saskatoon
Players of Canadian football from Saskatchewan
Canadian football offensive linemen
Simon Fraser Clan football players
Winnipeg Blue Bombers players
Olympic wrestlers of Canada
Olympic silver medalists for Canada
Wrestlers at the 1984 Summer Olympics
Canadian male sport wrestlers
Olympic medalists in wrestling
Medalists at the 1984 Summer Olympics
Pan American Games medalists in wrestling
Pan American Games bronze medalists for Canada
Wrestlers at the 1983 Pan American Games